The Municipality of Minitonas – Bowsman is a rural municipality (RM) in the Parkland Region of Manitoba, Canada. More precisely, it is located in the Swan Valley area.

History

The RM was incorporated on January 1, 2015 via the amalgamation of the RM of Minitonas, the Town of Minitonas and the Village of Bowsman. It was formed as a requirement of The Municipal Amalgamations Act, which required that municipalities with a population less than 1,000 amalgamate with one or more neighbouring municipalities by 2015. The Government of Manitoba initiated these amalgamations in order for municipalities to meet the 1997 minimum population requirement of 1,000 to incorporate a municipality.

Communities
Constituent communities of the Municipality of Minitonas–Bowsman include:
Bowsman (unincorporated urban community)
Minitonas (unincorporated urban community)
Renwer (unorganized hamlet)

Demographics 

References 

Rural municipalities in Manitoba
2015 establishments in Manitoba
Manitoba municipal amalgamations, 2015
Populated places established in 2015